The Vietnam Center and Archive collects and preserves the documentary record of the Vietnam War. The Vietnam Center and Archive, part of Texas Tech University, is the nation's largest and most comprehensive collection of information on the Vietnam War. On August 17, 2007, the Texas Tech Vietnam Center became the first U.S. institution to sign a formalized exchange agreement with the State Records and Archives Department of Vietnam. This opens the door for a two-way exchange between the entities.

History 

In May 1989, a group of Vietnam veterans from West Texas gathered at Texas Tech University to discuss what they might do, in a positive way, about their experiences in Vietnam. Their meeting was spearheaded by Dr. James Reckner, a Texas Tech military history professor and two-tour Navy veteran of the Vietnam War who had become concerned with his students’ lack of knowledge about the war.  The group's immediate decision was to form a Vietnam Archive and begin collecting and preserving materials relating to the American Vietnam experience.

On December 2, 1989, the Texas Tech University Board of Regents approved the creation of the Center for the Study of the Vietnam Conflict. Its dual missions are to fund and guide the development of the Vietnam Archive and encourage continuing study of all aspects of the American Vietnam experience.

The group of veterans who first met in May 1989 was invited to form a board to provide guidance and support for the Vietnam Center. Since then, the Vietnam Center Advisory Board has met regularly to provide advice as the Vietnam Center and Archive at Texas Tech has evolved.

Many of the veterans who attended the first meeting in May 1989 continue to advise the Vietnam Center today.

In 2009, the Vietnam Center and Archive celebrated its 20th Anniversary.  The guest speaker for the 20th Anniversary Ball was H. Ross Perot.  Mr. Perot spoke about his work on POW/MIA issues, as well as the experiences of his friend, Congressman Sam Johnson, a former POW from the Vietnam War.

Vietnam Center and Archive's goals 

The Vietnam Center's mission is to support and encourage research and education regarding all aspects of the American Vietnam experience; promoting a greater understanding of this experience and the peoples and cultures of Southeast Asia.  The Vietnam Center provides administrative support for the Vietnam Archive and promotes education by organizing and hosting conferences and symposia each year.  The Vietnam Center is currently located in the basement of the Math building at Texas Tech University.

The Vietnam Archive's mission is to collect and preserve the documentary record of the Vietnam War. The Archive is committed to preserving the record of individuals who participated in the War and to providing greater understanding of their experiences. While the Vietnam Archive continues this commitment as its primary objective, it has expanded its collection policy to include records of veterans' organizations and scholars of the period as well as other individuals and organizations who share experiences from the war in Vietnam.

The Vietnam Archive has collected millions of pages of material and tens of thousands of photographs, slides, maps, periodicals, audio, moving images, and books related to the Vietnam War, Indochina, and the impact of the war on the United States and Southeast Asia.  The Vietnam Archive continues to collect materials today. It is a donation-driven archive, meaning they only have items that people have donated to them.  A large portion of their materials are from military veterans, but the archive also contains collections donated by researchers and civilian anti-war demonstrators.  The Vietnam Archive places equal importance upon preserving records relating to all aspects of the Vietnam War and wishes to preserve a complete history of the war era. It is currently located in the Southwest Collection/Special Collections Library building at Texas Tech University.

Special Projects

The Virtual Vietnam Archive 

The Virtual Vietnam Archive was created in December 2000 through funding provided by the Institute of Museum and Library Services (IMLS) and currently contains over 3.2 million pages of scanned materials. Types of material include documents, photographs, slides, negatives, oral histories, artifacts, moving images, sound recordings, maps, and collection finding aids. All non-copyrighted and digitized materials are available for users to download free of charge. When the Virtual Vietnam Archive project is complete, it will include a record for every item in the Vietnam Archive.  A staff of full-time employees and part-time student employees work to digitize the materials and place them onto the Virtual Archive.

Over 1400 of the Vietnam Archive's collections have been partially or completely digitized.  Digitized collections include the Pike Collection, Social Movements Collection, Admiral Elmo Zumwalt Collection, the Combined Document Exploitation Center (CDEC) Collection, and the Diaries of Dr. Dang Thuy Tram. Additionally, over 12,000 documents from the US Marine Corps History Division are available in the Virtual Archive. Over 700 Oral Histories are available online, many transcribed, as well as over 100,000 images.  New materials are being added daily.

In addition to the Virtual Vietnam Archive search page, which allows users to research across all media types, the Vietnam Archive has also created a search page specifically for their map collection.  This page allows for searching by map title, scale, latitude/longitude, and grid zone.  There are currently over 1000 maps are available.

The Oral History Project 

The Oral History Project of the Vietnam Archive was created in 1999. The history of the wars in Southeast Asia is not complete without the inclusion of the voices of those who were in some way involved. To that end, the mission of the OHP is to create and preserve a more complete record of the wars in Southeast Asia by preserving, through recorded interviews, the recollections and experiences of all who were involved in those wars. Anyone can participate, whether an American veteran, a former ally or enemy of the U.S., an anti-war protester, a government employee, a family member of a veteran, etc. Currently the Oral History Project has conducted interviews with over 700 people.  The audio of all of the interviews is available online, and many have been completely  transcribed.

The Vietnamese American Heritage Project 

The Vietnamese American Heritage Project, created in 2008, supports the Vietnam Archive’s mission to document the war from all perspectives by providing documentation of the post-war social and political history of Vietnamese Americans who immigrated to the United States during and after the Vietnam War. A component of the archive, the VAHP is composed of a full-time Vietnamese American Heritage Archivist and one part-time student assistant who collect, preserve, and make accessible to the public materials that document the experiences and contributions of Vietnamese Americans in American society. The VAHP aims to enhance the study of the Vietnamese immigration and resettlement experience by providing reference services to researchers and increasing Vietnamese American participation in the archive’s Oral History Project, conducting outreach activities, and developing cooperative relationships with other institutions dedicated to preserving Vietnamese American’s rich heritage. The cornerstone of the VAHP is the Vietnam Archives’ Families of Vietnamese Political Prisoners Association (FVPPA) Collection. During the 1980s and 1990s, the FVPPA successfully helped over 10,000 former Vietnamese reeducation camp detainees and their families immigrate to the US and other countries through the United Nations High Commissioner for Refugee’s (UNHCR) Orderly Departure Program (ODP).

Veterans' Organizations and Associations 

The Vietnam Archive is actively striving to preserve the history and documents of the Veterans Associations and Organizations, as well as their members.  Vietnam Archive staff travel to numerous reunions each year, and many Associations and their members have donated collections of materials.

All donated materials are digitized and added to the Virtual Vietnam Archive.

Online Exhibits 

Online Exhibits are used to highlight Vietnam Archive materials and to celebrate or commemorate events or aspects of the Vietnam War.  Recently added exhibits include The Tet Offensive; Saigon: April 30, 1975, and pages celebrating the birthdays of each of the US Military Branches.  The Online Exhibit program is ongoing, and new exhibits are added often.

Subject Guides 

Staff of the Vietnam Archive have created subject guides on a variety of topics in order to provide researchers with better and more comprehensive access to the materials in the Vietnam Archive's collections.  Recently added topics include: The Tet Offensive; April 30, 1975 Saigon; Dustoff / Medevac; and Agent Orange.  Subject Guides include links to digital materials, including still images, moving images, documents, maps, and oral histories.

Conferences, Symposia, and Events 

The Vietnam Center and Archive maintains an active schedule of events, including a yearly conference or symposium, a guest lecture series, annual film festival, and an annual celebration of the Vietnamese New Year, Tet.  Many of these events are free and open to the public.

Conferences and Symposia 

Since 1993, the Vietnam Center has hosted at least one conference a year, usually in the spring, with every third year being a larger symposium.  The smaller yearly conferences are focused on a single topic, with the topic changing each year, and feature one panel of presentations at a time.  Recent topics include: "Lessons Learned, Lessons Lost: Counterinsurgency from Vietnam to Iraq and Afghanistan;" "Laos, Cambodia, Thailand and the Vietnam War;" and "The Impact of Culture, Ethnicity, Race, and Religion in the Vietnam War."  The Triennial Symposiums are much larger and have a variety of topics.  Any interested person can submit a paper for presentation, and there are often multiple simultaneous presentations.  All sessions of the conferences and symposia are filmed, and the videos are placed online for researchers and people who were unable to attend to view.

Guest Lecture Series 

In 2011, the Vietnam Center and Archive initiated their first Guest Lecture Series.  Speakers for the inaugural season included: Adrian Cronauer, the Former Air Force DJ made famous in the movie "Good Morning Vietnam!"  Adrian later served as a Special Assistant to the Director of the Pentagon's POW/MIA Office; Kim Phuc, also known as "the girl in the picture," was photographed running down a road naked and on fire after a napalm strike on her village.  Kim now runs a non-profit organization dedicated to healing children in war-torn areas and is a UNSECO Goodwill Ambassador for Peace; LeAnn Thieman, a nurse involved in Operation Babylift, a mission to evacuate Vietnamese babies from South Vietnam as it fell to communist troops in 1975; Dr. Kara Dixon Vuic, a professor at Bridgewater College in Virginia and author of "Officer, Nurse, Woman: The Army Nurse Corps in the Vietnam War;" and Dave Carey, a retired Navy Captain shot down over Vietnam who spent five and a half years as a POW in Hanoi.

The lecture series continues in 2012 with five new speakers, including noted author and veteran of the Vietnam War Dr. Lewis "Bob" Sorley; Chief Executive Officer of the Marine Corps University Foundation Brig. General Tom Draude; PTSD expert, author and veteran of the Vietnam War Dr. Raymond Scurfield; former Air Force Pilot and member of the National Aviation Hall of Fame Dick Rutan; and former running back for the Pittsburgh Steelers and member of the 196th Light Infantry Brigade in Vietnam Rocky Bleier.

Asian Pacific American Heritage Month Film Festival 

The Vietnam Center and Archive holds a film festival every month celebrating Asian Pacific American Heritage Month (APAHM).  Selected films cover a wide range of topics, and often focus on the Vietnamese American experience.  Films in the 2011 festival include Green Dragon; Rashomon; the Toll of the Sea; and Kim's Story. APAHM is May, but the film festival is held in April so that students at Texas Tech may attend before finals and the summer break.

Tet, The Vietnamese New Year 

Every year the Vietnam Center hosts a celebration of the Vietnamese New Year, Tet, on the Texas Tech Campus.  The festivities include Vietnamese food traditionally served on New Years, and a program about Tet.  Recent programs have been put on by members of the TTU Vietnamese Student Association.

Future of the Vietnam Center and Archive 

The remembrance of the Vietnam War has expanded at a fast pace at Texas Tech, and the Vietnam Center and Archive are rapidly outgrowing their current spaces and in need of a greatly enlarged new facility. The Texas Tech System Board of Regents has allocated 12 acres of land on the existing Texas Tech campus for this new building, which will enable the gathering of all aspects of the Center and Archive under one roof. As well, the creation of a world-class museum of the Vietnam War will portray the young men and women who served in Vietnam in an honorable and objective way. At the same time, the museum will critically examine all aspects of American policy in Vietnam.

The facility must provide adequate storage and office space for a rapidly expanding archive, oral history project, Virtual Vietnam Archive and Vietnam Center Staff. Also important, the building will provide meeting facilities for Vietnam veteran groups to hold reunion meetings, facilitating Vietnam Center and Archive staff in displaying veteran group-specific artifacts that might not at that time be on display for the general public. Vietnam veterans will have an opportunity to critique the Texas Tech Vietnam War museum, and provide memories and other insights that will help the project staff to gather correct versions of individual stories. The new facility will attract even greater donations of artifacts and documents, making the planning of future space essential. The facility will also have adequate outdoor spaces for static display of major military artifacts, such as aircraft and military equipment.

References

External links 
 Vietnam Center and Archive website

Texas Tech University
Vietnam War
Organizations based in Lubbock, Texas
Oral history